Trampoline is a full-service marketing, branding, advertising, web development and mobile agency headquartered in Halifax, Nova Scotia. The firm was founded in 1988 and originally named Page & Wood. The agency was renamed Trampoline Creative Inc. in 2004 and has operated as Trampoline and Trampoline Branding.  In 2018, Trampoline publicly launched Twist by Trampoline, an agency within the agency dedicated to smaller businesses that wouldn't typically work with a larger agency.  Late in 2018, Twist purchased BITS Creative agency, fully staffing itself to offer significant digital and web services beyond what Twist and Trampoline offered in the past.

In July 2011, Trampoline relocated its head office from Alexander Keith's Brewery Market complex to the former Carsand Mosher building at the corner of Blower Street and Barrington Street as part of the revitalization of Halifax's downtown core. In late 2019, the agency returned to the Brewery Market in the former CBCL building facing Hollis Street.

Page & Wood
Page & Wood was founded in 1988 by Eric Wood and Dennis Page, father of actor Elliot Page. The firm was renamed Trampoline in 2004. Mark and Leslie Gascogine purchased the agency in 2007.

Twist & Bits 
Twist by Trampoline was founded as Brandbounce and later renamed.  In late 2018, Twist also purchased Ian Bezanson's BITS Creative Agency which was founded in the early 2000s in the basement of Bezanson's home. Twist & Bits continues as an agency within the agency and a separate identity today, but is closely affiliated with Trampoline.

Past and Current Clients

The following is an incomplete list of notable clients.

National or International

Canada Post
Charm Diamond Centres
 Empire Theatres
 Fondation Michaëlle Jean Foundation
Ocean Nutrition Canada

Regional

2009 ICF Canoe Sprint World Championships
Atlantic Film Festival
Bell Aliant
Discover Saint John
Eastlink
Halifax Comedy Festival
Halifax Shopping Centre
Injury Free Nova Scotia

Nova Scotia Department of Health and Wellness
Nova Scotia Fisheries and Aquaculture
Nova Scotia Liquor Corporation
Pierceys (RONA)
Port of Halifax
Saint Mary's University
The Chronicle Herald
Tourism Prince Edward Island

Awards
2013 International Council of Shopping Centers, Canadian Shopping Centre Awards Silver (Event or Sales Promotion) "The Big Black Bow Event" for Halifax Shopping Centre
2012 Gold ICE Award (Print Campaign) "Ship in a bottle" for Tall Ships 2012
2012 ICE Craft Award (Retouching) "Ship in a bottle" for Tall Ships 2012
2012 Silver ICE Award (Interactive) "Bloom!" for Halifax Shopping Centre
2012 Fastest Growing Companies, No. 13 in More than $1 million but less than $25 million in revenue category
2012 International Council of Shopping Centers, Canadian Shopping Centre Awards Silver (Emerging Technology) "Bloom!" for Halifax Shopping Centre
2012 Design Edge Award (Best of Region) "Youth Addictions Awareness" for Nova Scotia Department of Health and Wellness
2012 Design Edge Award (Advertising: Outdoor) "Shelter Nova Scotia" for Shelter Nova Scotia
2011 Gold ICE Award (Broadcast, Public Service – Single) “Get the Goat” for Injury Free Nova Scotia
2011 Gold ICE Award (Online Initiative – Single) “Fall Haul” for the Halifax Shopping Centre
2011 International Council of Shopping Centers, Canadian Shopping Centre Awards Silver (Digital Media) "Start Fall with a Haul" for Halifax Shopping Centre
2011 Design Edge Award (Advertising: Outdoor) "Laughter's Infectious" for Halifax Comedy Festival
2011 Design Edge Award (Advertising: Print) "Keep your secrets secret" for Shredder's Inc.
2010 Gold ICE Award (Logo/Identity) Dafodil Place
2010 Gold ICE Award (Direct Mail) Shredder's Inc.
2009 Silver ICE Award (Print - Single) "Need to Know" for The Chronicle Herald
2009 Silver ICE Award (Print - Single) "Shelter's not easy to find" for Bide Awhile
2009 Silver ICE Award (Print - Campaign) "Need to Know" for The Chronicle Herald
2009 Silver ICE Award (Non-Traditional - Single or Campaign) "That's Life" for Saint Mary's University
2008 Gold ICE Award (Direct Mail - Single or Campaign) "Blueprints" for Pierceys
2005 Gold ICE Award (Newspaper - Single) "Scissors" for FRED
2005 Gold ICE Award (Newspaper - Campaign) "Scissors, Comb" for FRED
2005 Gold ICE Award (Out of Home - Campaign) "Scissors, Comb" for FRED
2005 Silver ICE Award (Newspaper - Single) "Telephone Wires" for Dalplex
2005 Silver ICE Award (Out of Home - Single) "Scissors" for FRED
2005 Merit, Advertising & Design Club of Canada (Newspaper - Single) "Telephone Wires" for Dalplex

References

Advertising agencies of Canada
Companies based in Halifax, Nova Scotia
Canadian companies established in 1988
Marketing companies established in 1988
Companies based in Nova Scotia
1988 establishments in Nova Scotia